Carlos Romero (February 15, 1927 – June 21, 2007) was a professional ice skater who turned to acting in films and television. He was a prolific character actor, who appeared on 132 television episodes and eleven films during his half-century of performing.

Early life
He was born Carlos Romero Jr, the only child of Carlos Romero Sr and Malvina Polo. His father, born Geronimo Quiroga in Monterrey, Mexico, fled to the United States as a child in 1910 with his large family. They had owned a hotel and theater in Monterrey, but supported the wrong side in the struggle between Venustiano Carranza and Pancho Villa during the Mexican Revolution.

The extended family adopted the stage name "The Dancing Romeros" for their act during the 1920's, when they performed shows at nightclubs, and later at movie theaters, in between exhibitions of silent pictures.

Carlos Sr switched to designing dance routines for nightclubs and films in the early 1930's. He became a naturalized U.S. citizen in 1938 under his stage name, sponsored by members of the Hollywood film industry with whom he worked. The family settled into the San Fernando Valley of California, where young Carlos attended first Van Nuys High School then North Hollywood High School. Carlos Romero Jr applied for his first social security card at age 15 in June 1942.

Besides film and nightclubs, his father also designed dances for Fanchon and Marco's entertainment partnership. They hired him to design routines for the International Polarink Follies, an ice show that debuted at the newly opened Polarink in Long Beach, California during March 1939. This show had business ties with the more well-known Ice Follies, and by 1943 Carlos Sr had become a director for it as well. His contracts with film studios usually included a clause granting him two months annual leave for work on ice shows. Carlos Jr thus had an early introduction to entertainment ice skating as a profession, as opposed to competitive skating.

Start in skating
The Ice Follies of 1944 tour started in Los Angeles during September 1943. As Carlos Jr related it to a later interviewer, he was standing backstage at an early performance when someone shoved a horse head mask over him and pushed him out onto the ice. At sixteen he became a full time pro skater, traveling with the Ice Follies on its year-round tour. His hiring as a teenager was likely due to the absence of 21 male cast and crew of military age for the war effort. Newspapers, to distinguish him from his well-known father, consistently referred to him as "Carlos Romero Jr", which was his Ice Follies billing as well. He was among the cast in that year's official program and newspapers listed him with the other performers.

The Ice Follies was then entering its eighth year, with annual attendance approaching two million. Named for the coming year, each Ice Follies show would start performances at the Pan-Pacific Auditorium in Los Angeles during September. The entire company would travel on the Ice Follies Special, a special train, usually chartered from Great Northern Railways, to cities across the northern US and Canada.  The tour would finish up in San Francisco,  playing the current show for the summer months during evenings at the Winterland Arena, while rehearsing the new show for the coming season during the day.

Carlos was in Boston on tour with the Ice Follies of 1945 during February of that year when he turned eighteen. He registered for the draft with a local board in Boston, which then forwarded it to the district board for his permanent residence in Encino, California. According to the draft registrar, Carlos stood 6' 1 3/4" (187.3 cm), weighed 152 pounds (68.9 kg), had hazel eyes, brown hair, and a sallow complexion. He lived with his father in Encino, was employed by the Ice Follies, had scars on the back of his head and right forefinger, and was left-handed.

Military service
On June 26, 1945, while still on tour with the Ice Follies, Carlos enlisted in the US Army. According to his enlistment papers, Carlos was single, a citizen, had completed three years of high school, and was an athlete by occupation.  He wasn't inducted right away, for he continued to perform with the Ice Follies through August 1945.

Carlos Jr apparently served in the US Army from early September 1945 through late August 1947, given his dates of absence from the Ice Follies. A later interview said he was assigned to the Signal Corps, possibly with a specialized entertainment unit, for he claimed to have emceed a GI show in Berlin for which he also did a song and dance routine.

Reporter Pat Laughrey interviewed Carlos Romero Jr just after his military service, when he had rejoined the Ice Follies. The tone of the interview may be judged from Carlos relating to the reporter that his nickname with the show was "Romero the Great". Like one of the charming, witty, fast-talking characters he would later play on television, he was not above giving a slight spin to the truth, saying he had enlisted after "December 1941", and served in France, Belgium, and Germany, letting the unwary assume from the order of countries that he was with the liberation forces, rather than the army of occupation.

An anonymous newspaper blurb from the same time frame mentioned Carlos Jr was a "Purple Heart wearer", while a later article referred to the performer Carlos Romero Jr as a "decorated war hero". The same description was repeated, along with the addendum that he had "narrowly escaped death", in a capsule profile from an official Ice Follies program. The ultimate source for these unlikely statements is unknown.

Post service skating
Starting in September 1947, Carlos toured with the Ice Follies of 1948. His father had switched to working for the competing Ice Vanities troupe in 1946. Despite the parental defection, Carlos resumed performing with the show in character parts, generally comic acrobatic bits. The tour's premiere at the Pan Pacific Auditorium in Hollywood was broadcast live by KTLA on September 18, 1947. This was Carlos first known appearance on screen, playing a matador trying to battle with the Disney character Ferdinand the Bull. Though the broadcast was not recorded, home movie film of the same premiere, including a brief scene of Carlos, was on YouTube as of August 2021.

While on tour during December 1947, Carlos married Ice Follies headliner and former National Pairs Champion Betty Schalow, who was two years older than him. The ceremony occurred during the finale of a Follies performance at the arena in Hershey, Pennsylvania, a longtime venue for all the touring ice shows. Carlos Romero Sr had to give his legal consent to the marriage, as under Pennsylvania law at the time the twenty year old Carlos Jr was still a minor. The marriage came as a complete surprise to their colleagues with the tour. The event was widely reported in newspapers, and marked a rise in Carlos profile with the tour. Though well-reviewed by the newspapers, Carlos was never a headliner, for he had no competitive skating background and lacked the technical virtuosity demanded of such.

Carlos continued touring with the Ice Follies through the spring of 1948 and stayed with them as they went into their summer quarters in San Francisco. He was cast again in Ice Follies of 1949 and the following year in Ice Follies of 1950. He was with the latter tour at least until January 1950, when newspapers stopped listing him among the other performers. Carlos and Betty apparently divorced in late 1949, though the exact date and location are not known. Betty soon remarried to another skater with the show and stayed with the Ice Follies until 1956.

Stage and screen acting
Despite his father's contacts in the film industry, Carlos started his acting career on the stage. According to a later Hedda Hopper column, he seems to have been active in both New York and West Coast theatre, though details are lacking for the former. He was mentioned as a new addition to the cast of the Los Angeles based Geller Theatre Workshop in November 1951, for a production of Moss Hart's Light Up The Sky, as "a former Ice Follies skater, who also has a number of years' Little Theater experience". His next documented stage performance was again with the Geller Theatre, in October 1953, for a production of The Two Mrs. Carrolls. This was also his first billing without the generational suffix of "Junior", which he abandoned going forward.

Carlos Romero did an episode of State Trooper in December 1957 that is his first known non-skating television role. He had supposedly done some television in New York, but verification for this is lacking. He had a surprising career arc on the screen, having a flood of television and film roles immediately upon this debut. For some early television character parts he was asked to wear a fake mustache. He had always been clean-shaven for performances prior to 1958, but casting directors and audiences soon came to expect a mustache, and he obliged. He would still appear without one for Native American roles, and for the occasional contemporary part.

Later career
For 1981, Carlos had no television appearances, breaking a string of twenty-four years of continuous performances. He made up for the gap in the next two years, playing his longest recurring role for a series on Falcon Crest. His TV work gradually dwindled away to once a year in the mid 1980s, though he may have done work outside the US that isn't readily available for reference. His last known performance of any sort was at age 70 in 1997, for an episode of the Spanish comedy series La casa de los líos.

Carlos Romero passed away in Ferndale, California on June 21, 2007.

Personal life
Carlos was interested in flying as a young man, and qualified for a pilot's license in 1947. He also liked bowling, swimming, riding horses, and hunting. Carlos was always readily accessible to fans who wanted a photo with him. He was noted for his keen sense of humor and fast patter, and was not above joshing an interviewer with exaggerations about himself.

Almost ten years after his divorce from Betty Schalow, Carlos married Alix Bainbridge, nine years his junior, during August 1958. They had a son, born a little more than a year later, but divorced in August 1967.  Despite a strong physical resemblance, Carlos Romero was apparently not related to actor Cesar Romero.

Filmography

References

External links
 
 
 Social Security Death Index

1927 births
2007 deaths
American male actors of Mexican descent
American male film actors
American male television actors
Male actors from Los Angeles
20th-century American male actors